Beverley Esterhuizen (born 1 October 1968) is a South African former cricketer. He played in one List A and three first-class matches for Border from 1990/91 to 1995/96.

See also
 List of Border representative cricketers

References

External links
 

1968 births
Living people
South African cricketers
Border cricketers
Sportspeople from Qonce